Super King may refer to:

Beechcraft Super King Air, aircraft
Chennai Super Kings, a cricket team
A Futurama character (actually Bender), see Less Than Hero
Monster chess, a chess variant
Superkings cigarettes
A bed size
Super Kings toys, see Matchbox (brand)